is a private university in Kurume, Fukuoka, Japan, established in 1976.

KIT offers undergraduate degree programs in mechanical engineering, electrical engineering, information engineering, architecture, and civil engineering. The college also offers a doctoral program in engineering. 

KIT offers undergraduate programs in five departments: Mechanical Engineering, Electrical and Electronic Engineering, Information Engineering, Materials Science and Engineering, and Architecture. It also offers graduate programs in these areas, as well as in Applied Mathematics and Physics.

External links
 Official website in English

Educational institutions established in 1976
Private universities and colleges in Japan
Kurume
Universities and colleges in Fukuoka Prefecture
Engineering universities and colleges in Japan
1976 establishments in Japan